Milíkov may refer to places in the Czech Republic:

Milíkov (Cheb District), a municipality and village in the Karlovy Vary Region
Milíkov (Frýdek-Místek District), a municipality and village in the Moravian-Silesian Region
Milíkov, a village and administrative part of Stříbro in the Plzeň Region